These are the Kowloon West results of the 1998 Hong Kong legislative election. The election was held on 24 May 1998 and all 3 seats in Kowloon West where consisted of Yau Tsim Mong District, Sham Shui Po District and Kowloon City District were contested. The Democratic Party's Lau Chin-shek and James To won two seats and was followed by Jasper Tsang of the Democratic Alliance for the Betterment of Hong Kong. Frederick Fung of the Association for Democracy and People's Livelihood was defeated and ousted from the legislature.

Overall results
After election:

Candidates list

See also
Legislative Council of Hong Kong
Hong Kong legislative elections
1998 Hong Kong legislative election

References

1998 Hong Kong legislative election